Suzanne Labin (6 May 1913 – 22 January 2001) was a French Socialist writer and political scientist, known particularly for her anti-communism, anti-totalitarianism and pro-democracy writings.

Writings and reviews
In reviewing of her book The secret of democracy, Time magazine wrote:

Dale Pontius wrote in the Annals of the American Academy of Political and Social Science:

Selected bibliography
 Stalin's Russia, London, Victor Gollancz Ltd., 1949. 492 pages. Translated by Edward Fitzgerald. With a Foreword by Arthur Koestler
 The secret of democracy, New York, The Vanguard Press, 1955. 258 pages
 The technique of Soviet propaganda, 1959. 31 pages
 The technique of Soviet propaganda. A study presented by the Subcommittee to Investigate the Administration of the Internal Security Laws of the Committee on the Judiciary, United States Senate, Eighty-sixth Congress, second session, Washington, U.S. Govt. Print. Off., 1960. v-38 pages
 The anthill: The human condition in Communist China, London, Stevens & Sons Limited - New York, Frederick A. Praeger, 1960. 443 pages. Translated by Edward Fitzgerald
 The unrelenting war: a study of the strategy and techniques of communist propaganda and infiltration, New York, American-Asian Educational Exchange, 1960. 47 pages. Edited by Moshe Decter. With an introduction by Charles Edison
 Counter attack;: A plan to win the political warfare of the Soviets, New York, American-Asian Educational Exchange, 1962. 52 pages
 Vietnam : an eye-witness account, Springfield, Crestwood Books, 1964. viii-98 pages. Introduction by Bryton Barron
 The techniques of Soviet propaganda: A study presented by the Subcommittee to Investigate the Administration of the Internal Security Act and other Internal Security Laws of the Committee on the Judiciary, United States Congress, Eighty-ninth Congress, first session, Washington, U.S. Govt. Print. Off., 1965. vi-64 pages
 Embassies of subversion, New York, American Afro-Asian Educational Exchange, 1965. 47 pages. Introduction by Thomas J. Dodd, U.S.S.
 Sellout in Vietnam?, Arlington, Crestwood Books, 1966. 98 pages. Introduction by Bryton Barron
 Red foxes in the chicken coop: How to Win against Communism, Arlington, Crestwood Books, 1966. 267 pages. Introduction by Eugene Lyons
 The techniques of Soviet propaganda: A study presented by the Subcommittee to Investigate the Administration of the Internal Security Act and other Internal Security Laws of the Committee on the Judiciary, United States Congress, Ninetieth Congress, first session, Washington, U.S. Govt. Print. Off., 1967. vi-63 pages
 Promise and reality: fifty years of Soviet-Russian 'achievements''', London, European Freedom Council (British Section), 1967. 32 pages. Edited by John Graham with a foreword by Dowager Lady Birdwood
 Fifty years: The USSR versus the USA, New York, Twin Circle Publishing Company, 1968. 236 pages
 Vietnam assessment, Saigon, The Vietnam Council on Foreign Relations, 1972. 25 pages
 Hippies, drugs, and promiscuity, New Rochelle, Arlington House, 1972. 264 pages. Translated by Stephanie Winston
 Chile, the crime of resistance, Richmond, Foreign Affairs Pub. Co., 1982. xiii-282 pages
 Cultivating Thinking in English and the Language Arts'', Crestwood Books, 1991

References

External links

French political writers
French anti-communists
2001 deaths
1913 births
Far-right politics in France